The British Rail Class 47 or Brush Type 4 is a class of British railway diesel-electric locomotive that was developed in the 1960s by Brush Traction.

A total of 512 Class 47s were built at Brush's Falcon Works in Loughborough and at British Railways' Crewe Works between 1962 and 1968, which made them the most numerous class of British mainline diesel locomotive. The locomotives have had various renumberings during their existence; this table attempts to catalogue those changes.

As of January 2020, 78 locomotives still exist as Class 47s, with 33 having been rebuilt as Class 57; 32 Class 47s have been preserved, and 34 retain "operational status" on the mainline.

Fleet list

See also
BR Class 37 renumbering

Notes

References

Bibliography
Ian Allan ABC of British Motive Power, several editions
British Rail Locomotives and Coaching Stock, Platform 5, several editions
Today's Railways monthly updates, Platform 5
Kenny Barclay, British Rail in the 1980s and 1990s: Diesel Locomotives and DMUs, Amberley Publishing, 2017 .
Ross Taylor, Class 47 and 57 Locomotives, Amberley Publishing, 2016 .

External links
www.class47.co.uk

47 locomotives
British Rail Class 47 locomotives